Milburn Creek is a stream in the U.S. state of West Virginia.

Milburn Creek was named after one Mr. Milburn, a pioneer settler.

See also
List of rivers of West Virginia

References

Rivers of Fayette County, West Virginia
Rivers of West Virginia